Makonde may refer to:

 Makonde people, an ethnic group from East Africa
 Makonde art, the art of the Makonde people
 Makonde language, the language spoken by the Makonde people
 Makonde (District), a district of the Mashonaland West province of Zimbabwe
 Makonde Plateau, a plateau in the Mtwara Region of Tanzania. The adjacent Mueda Plateau in Mozambique is also referred to as the Makonde or Maconde plateau.